The 1976 Grambling Tigers football team was an American football team that represented Grambling State University as a member of the Southwestern Athletic Conference (SWAC) during the 1976 NCAA Division II football season. In its 34th season under head coach Eddie Robinson, Grambling State compiled an 8–4 record (4–2 against conference opponents), finished in second place in the SWAC, and outscored opponents by a total of 313 to 202.

Schedule

References

Grambling State
Grambling State Tigers football seasons
Grambling State Tigers football